The 1946 Cork Junior Hurling Championship was the 49th staging of the Cork Junior Hurling Championship since its establishment by the Cork County Board. The championship ran from 29 September to 8 December 1946.

The final replay was played on 8 December 1946 at the Douglas Grounds, between Newtownshandrum and Clonakilty, in what was their first ever meeting in the final. Newtownshandrum won the match by 6-03 to 1-04 to claim their first ever championship title.

Results

Semi-finals

Final

References

Cork Junior Hurling Championship
Cork Junior Hurling Championship